Diego Canga Fano (born 25 December 1964) is a Spanish civil servant for the European Union. He is the lead People's Party (PP) candidate in the 2023 Asturian regional election.

Biography
Born in Oviedo, Asturias, Canga graduated from the Department of Law at the University of Oviedo and obtained a degree in Special Law of European Affairs from the Université libre de Bruxelles and a certificate in English law from the University of Cambridge. In 1991, he began work as a civil servant within the organs of the European Union: the European Commission, the European Parliament and the Council of the European Union. From February 2017, he worked as chief of cabinet for the President of the European Parliament, Antonio Tajani.

Canga was a founder of Compromiso Asturias XXI, a non-profit organisation that connects emigrants from the region. In September 2018, he received the Silver Medal of Asturias for his work with the organisation.

In November 2022, Canga was chosen as the People's Party (PP) lead candidate in the 2023 Asturian regional election, while the previous lead candidate Teresa Mallada would remain as president of the People's Party of Asturias.

References

1964 births
Living people
People from Oviedo
University of Oviedo alumni
Université libre de Bruxelles alumni
Alumni of the University of Cambridge
European civil servants
People's Party (Spain) politicians